Abdel-Shafi is a surname. Notable people with the surname include:

 Salah Abdel-Shafi (born 1962), Palestinian economist and ambassador, son of Haidar
 Haidar Abdel-Shafi (1919–2007), Palestinian physician, community leader, and political leader

Compound surnames